Geydari (also Romanized as Geydārī) is a village in Naseri Rural District, Khanafereh District, Shadegan County, Khuzestan Province, Iran. At the 2006 census, its population was 1,954, in 281 families.

References 

Populated places in Shadegan County